The 1907 Howard Bulldogs football team was an American football team that represented Howard College (now known as the Samford University) as an independent during the 1907 college football season. In their second year under head coach John Counselman, the team compiled an 3–6 record.

Schedule

References

Howard
Samford Bulldogs football seasons
Howard Bulldogs football